This is a list of Hemendra Kumar Roy's works.

Novels
Aleyar Alo (1919)
Jaler Alpona (1920)
Kalboishakhi (1921) 
Payer Dhulo (1922)
Rasakali (1923)
Jharer Ratri (1930)
Padma-Kanta (1926)

Other novels include: Phulsajya, Parir Prem, Manikanchan, Pather Meye, Manimalinir Goli, Panchasharer Kirti etc.

Juvenile literature

Bajrabhairaber Golpo (1946)
Dersho Khokar Kando (1947)
Mohan Mela (1947)
Bhagabaner Chabuk (1947)
Sundarbaner Raktapagal (1947)
Hatya Ebong Tarpor (1947)
Mrityumallar (1948)
Sulu-Sagarer Bhuture Desh (1948)
Ajana Dwiper Rani (1948)
Mohanpurer Smashan (1949)
Translated from a story by Sheridan Le Fanu
Kumarer Bagha Goyenda (1949)
Bishalgarher Duhswapno (1949)
Translated from Bram Stoker's Dracula
Chhotto Pomir Abhijaan (1949)
Sundarbaner Rakto Pagol (1950)
Amanushik Maanush (1950)
Count of Monte Cristo (1951)
Translated from the story of the same name by Alexander Dumas
Alo Diye Gelo Jara (1952)
Nabajuger Mahadanab (1952)
Paban (1952)
Guptodhoner Duhswapno (1952)
Tapoban (1952)
Himachaler Swapno (1952)
Sotyikaar Sherlok Holmes (1953)
Baghrajar Abhijaan (1954)
Digbijoyi Napoleon (1956)
Chaturbhujer Swakkhor (1956)
Chhatrapatir Chhora (1957)
Nishachori Bibhishika (1957)
Translated from Enter the Saint by Leslie Charteris
Alexander the Great (1957)
Chhotoder Shreshto Golpo (1958)
Sajahaner Mayur (1958)
Bibhishaner Jagaran (1959)
Jayantar Adventure (1959)
Goyenda, Bhut O Manush (1959)
Chalo Galpo Niketane (1960)
Runu-Tunur Adventure (1960)
Itihaser Raktakto Prantare (1961)
He Itihas Golpo Bolo (1961)
Kuber Purir Rahasya (1961)
Chhotoder Bhalo Bhalo Golpo (1961)
Ratrir Jatri (1961)
Podochinher upakhyan
Rotnoguhar guptodhon
Indrajaler maya

References

Hemendra Kumar Roy
Bibliographies by writer